Clusia clusioides is a small tree which is native to Puerto Rico and Hispaniola, in the family Clusiaceae. One characteristic are the opposite, very thick leaves. It is very common in the dwarf or elfin forests at elevations above , in particular in areas with much light (e.g., next to service roads in Puerto Rico's El Yunque rain forest). The gray and smooth bark of the tree is sometimes covered with mosses and other epiphytes including orchids.

References

clusioides
Plants described in 1860
Flora of Puerto Rico
Flora of Haiti
Flora of the Dominican Republic
Flora without expected TNC conservation status